Do What You Want may refer to:

 Do What You Want (album), an album by Garageland
 Do What You Want (EP), an EP by OK Go
 "Do What You Want" (OK Go song)
 Do What You Want (film), 1973 Argentine film
 "Do What You Want", a song by the Black Eyed Peas from Monkey Business
 "Do What You Want", a song by Bad Religion from Suffer
 "Do What You Want", a song by Drake Bell from It's Only Time

See also
"Do What U Want", a song by Lady Gaga from Artpop
"Do What You Wanna Do", debut single by T-Connection
Do What You Like (disambiguation)